Featuring Ourselves is a jazz/fusion album by Alex Machacek using the name "Mc Hacek." It was released by Next Generation Enterprises in 1999.

Track listing
 "Gnade" (Alex Machacek) – 6:56
 "Liebe, Jaz Und Übermut" (Tibor Kövesdi) – 8:15
 "Zapzarapp" (Alex Machacek) – 5:59
 "Jazzquiz - Hard Version" (Alex Machacek) – 0:51
 "Donna Lee - Easy Viennese Teenage Version" (Charlie Parker) – 2:17
 "Intro 2 7" (Alex Machacek) – 0:36
 "Allandig" (Alex Machacek) – 8:52
 "Bänderriss" (Tibor Kövesdi) – 8:37
 "Art-Subvention 97" (Alex Machacek) – 1:01
 "... In the Sky" (Tibor Kövesdi) – 7:13

Personnel 
 Alex Machacek – guitars
 Tibor Kövesdi – bass, keyboards
 Flip Philipp – mallets, percussion
 Harri Ganglberger – drums
 Fritz Kircher – violin (track 2)
 Gerswind Olthoff – viola (track 2)
 Arne Kircher – cello (track 2)
 Toni Mühlhofer – percussion (track 3)
 Stefan Maass – percussion (track 10)

References

1999 albums
Alex Machacek albums